The Women's 15 kilometre skiathlon competition at the FIS Nordic World Ski Championships 2021 was held on 27 February 2021.

Results
The race was started at 11:45.

References

Women's 15 kilometre pursuit